Sara Corner is an Indian beauty pageant contestant who won Miss India World in 2001 and represented India at Miss World 2001. Corner was born in Kolkata in an Anglo-Indian family. She graduated in Bachelor in Economics.

References

Year of birth missing (living people)
Living people
Miss World 2001 delegates
Female models from Kolkata
Anglo-Indian people